Alexis Gavrilopoulos (born 12 July 1981) is a Greek retired professional football player and the current manager of Asteras Amaliada F.C. in the 1st Elis Division.

Career

He is considered to be one of the most powerful and physically gifted footballers in whole Greece, as his body composition and muscle build are truly impressive.

However, his strong passion during the game caused him numerous injuries throughout his career, especially on his knees, as he always pushes himself to the limits.

External links 
Larissa FC transfer announcement at Larissa FC official website (Greek)

1981 births
Living people
Greek footballers
Levadiakos F.C. players
Atromitos F.C. players
Ionikos F.C. players
Athlitiki Enosi Larissa F.C. players
Panachaiki F.C. players
Veria F.C. players
Panegialios F.C. players
Association football forwards
People from Gastouni
Footballers from the Peloponnese